Windfall is an American serial drama television series about a group of people in an unnamed small city who win almost $400 million in a lottery. The series was created by Laurie McCarthy and Gwendolyn M. Parker and premiered on June 8, 2006, on NBC, taking the time slot occupied by ER during the rest of the year.

On August 31, 2006, NBC announced the show's cancellation by stating on its website that the episode that night would be the series finale. NBC also gave local affiliates the option of showing pre-season football instead and showing the final episode at each affiliates discretion.  Many affiliates took them up on this, planning to show it either much later that night or at other odd days/times during the Labor Day weekend (for example, WNBC-TV in New York planned to show the episode at 12:30pm on September 3, 2006).

In the United Kingdom and Middle East the show has been picked up by Five Life and Showtime Arabia respectively. It is also shown in Ireland on the channel 3e weekdays at 3pm.

Cast members
 Sarah Wynter as Beth Walsh
 Jason Gedrick as Cameron Walsh
 Jon Foster as Damian Brunner
 Alice Greczyn as Frankie McMahon
 Jaclyn DeSantis as Maggie Hernandez
 Lana Parrilla as Nina Schaefer
 Luke Perry as Peter Schaefer
 D.J. Cotrona as Sean Mathers
 Nikki DeLoach as Sunny van Hattern
 Peyton List as Tally Reida
 Malinda Williams as Kimberly George
 Sarah Rose Glassman as Daisy Schaefer
 Emma Prescott as Violet Schaefer
 Tembi Locke as Addie McMahon
 Larissa Drekonja as Galina Kokorev
 Jonathan LaPaglia as Dave Park
 Sarah Jane Morris as Zoe Reida
 Cheyenne Haynes as Isabel Hernandez

Production
The show was developed in early 2005 by Regency Television for Fox. At the time the show was known as Ticket To Ride. After ordering the pilot Fox decided to pass on the series. In June 2005 it was announced that NBC had picked up the series and would be shooting a new pilot. It was also confirmed that co-creator Gwendolyn Parker would no longer be involved with the show as she had moved on to work on Without a Trace.

Episode list
Windfall ranked 164 for the 2005-06 television season with an average of 5.510 million viewers. Due to the finale episode being preëmpted in many markets it is not even counted among the shows aired in primetime that week and thus there is no ratings for it.

See also
 The Millionaire (TV series)
 Lottery!
 Lucky 7 (TV series)

References

External links
 

2000s American drama television series
2006 American television series debuts
2006 American television series endings
English-language television shows
NBC original programming
Serial drama television series
Television series by 20th Century Fox Television
Television shows set in Los Angeles